Il terrorista, internationally released as The Terrorist, is a 1963 Italian war drama film directed by Gianfranco De Bosio. It is inspired to real life events of the Italian partisan Otello Pighin. The film entered the 24th Venice International Film Festival, in which it won the Pasinetti Award.

Cast 
 Gian Maria Volonté: Renato Braschi
 Philippe Leroy: Rodolfo Boscovich
 Tino Carraro: De Ceva "Smith"
 Anouk Aimée: Anna Braschi
 Giulio Bosetti: Ugo Ongaro
 Raffaella Carrà: Giuliana
 José Quaglio: Piero 
 Carlo Bagno: Oscar Varino
 Franco Graziosi: Aldrighi "Quadro"

References

External links

1963 films
1960s biographical drama films
1960s war drama films
Italian biographical drama films
Italian war drama films
Italian Campaign of World War II films
Films about Italian resistance movement
Films scored by Piero Piccioni
1963 drama films
Italian World War II films
1960s Italian films